KRPH is a radio station in Morristown, Arizona. Broadcasting on 99.5 FM, KRPH is owned by Deportes y Música Comunicaciones, LLC and carries a grupera/Regional Mexican format known as La Raza 99.5.

A second KRPH transmitter, dubbed KRPH-FM1, operates in Wittmann, Arizona.

History
In December 2006, ACE Radio Corporation received approval to build an FM station on 99.5 in Yarnell, Arizona. It was then sold to Magnolia Radio.

The station remained a construction permit until 2010, when Grupo Multimedia bought the construction permits for KRPH and KQMX in Lost Hills, California. By this time the CP specified operation in Morristown, closer to Phoenix.

From August 2011 to July 2012, KRPH was silent pending a relaunch of the station by Grupo Multimedia/Deportes y Música.

References

External links
 

RPH
Radio stations established in 2011
2011 establishments in Arizona
Regional Mexican radio stations in the United States